Shoghi is a small suburb of Shimla, Himachal Pradesh, India. Shoghi railway station serves the Shoghi town.

References

 

Neighbourhoods in Shimla